Michael Colgan (born  Michael Hughes) is a Northern Irish actor and novelist.

Born in Keady, County Armagh, Colgan was educated at Saint Patrick's Grammar School, Armagh and Corpus Christi College, Oxford, where he read English. He studied at l'École Internationale de Théâtre Jacques Lecoq in Paris and now lives in London.

A notable early performance in Saint Patrick's Grammar School, Armagh was the role of Harpagon in Molière's L'Avare, which was performed entirely in French. After theatre school in Paris he went back to Ireland to work with hi
 
He starred in the 2002 feature film This Is Not a Love Song directed by Bille Eltringham. He also spent a year working in the Abbey Theatre in Dublin and has appeared in several television productions, including Rebel Heart and Sunday (2002) for the BBC.

Colgan has worked at the Royal Shakespeare Company and in productions at the Royal Exchange, the Abbey Theatre, the Lyric Players' Theatre, Belfast, the Everyman Theatre, Liverpool, the Young Vic and the Tricycle Theatre.

In 2009 he was appearing at the Young Vic in Rupert Goold's critically acclaimed production of King Lear starring Pete Postlethwaite.

In 2013, Colgan played Richard Webb in the drama series What Remains. In 2014 he appeared in the first episode of the Channel 5 detective drama Suspects (TV series).

In 2016, Colgan published his first novel, The Countenance Divine, under his real name Michael Hughes. His second novel, Country, was published in August 2018.

Colgan has appeared in two separate depictions of the Chernobyl Disaster. The first being BBC's Surviving Disaster: Chernobyl Nuclear Disaster from 2006 in which he appears as Leonid Toptunov, senior reactor control chief engineer of Reactor 4. The second was HBO's 2019 mini-series Chernobyl in which he depicts Mikhail Shchadov, Soviet Minister of Coal Industry.

In 2020, Colgan starred as Rory Maguire in the third series of Nordic noir detective series Marcella.

Filmography

Film

Television

References

External links

Year of birth missing (living people)
Alumni of Corpus Christi College, Oxford
Living people
Male film actors from Northern Ireland
Male stage actors from Northern Ireland
Male television actors from Northern Ireland
People educated at St Patrick's Grammar School, Armagh
People from Keady
Royal Shakespeare Company members